Simonswood Brook is a minor,  river (brook) in Merseyside, England, that is a tributary to the River Alt in the Alt catchment. As the stream enters Kirkby, it is known as the Kirkby Brook.

Course 
Rising from Blackburn's Plantation in the Metropolitan Borough of St Helens, Simonswood Brook flows west into the Liverpool City Region, where it proceeds to flow a northwesterly course. After flowing under the Kirkby branch line via a culvert, Simonswood Brook briefly turns west before continuing its northwesterly course through Simonswood. It then flows into the Metropolitan Borough of Sefton and turns south through Melling Mount and finally into Kirkby in the Metropolitan Borough of Knowsley, near St Chad's Church, where it is then known as the Kirkby Brook and flows into the River Alt.

Water quality 
Water quality of the brook in 2019, according to the Environment Agency, a non-departmental public body sponsored by the United Kingdom's Department for Environment, Food and Rural Affairs:

References 

Rivers of Merseyside
Tributaries of the Alt